David Bensoussan (born 1947) is a Moroccan-Canadian author and educator. Bensoussan has worked in the Department of Electrical Engineering at the École de technologie supérieure of the Université du Québec since 1980. He is best known for his histories of the Jewish community of Morocco and for his leadership roles in the Sephardi Jewish community.  He has served as President of the Communauté Sépharade Unifiée du Québec (United Sefardic Community of Quebec).

Biography

Bensoussan holds a PhD in Electrical Engineering from McGill University.

He was born in Mogador, and lived there until the family moved to a larger city when he was eight.  His family left Morocco for Israel in 1965 when he was a teenager.  He earned his first degree in Israel, and moved from Israel to Canada in 1976.

In addition to his work as a professor and occasional employment in the tech sector, Bensoussan is author of a self-published, three-volume study of the Bible, La Bible Prise au Berceau, prefaced by biblical scholar André Chouraqui, in which he claims to have integrated historical, archaeological, and ethical analysis of the text.

Civic involvement
Until 2012, Bensoussan served as a sitting member of the Paul Martin and Stephen Harper government's Cross-Cultural Roundtable on Security. Established in 2005, the panel brought together prominent members from a number of Canada's cultural communities and government entities to discuss policy and program issues, and to promote dialogue and strengthening understanding between the national authorities and its electorate.

Bensoussan actively supported Irwin Cotler when he stood for Parliament.  He has served as vice president of the Canadian Jewish Congress.

Writing
Bensoussan won the Prix Haïm Zafrani, a literary prize, in 2012 for his 2010 book, Il était une fois le Maroc. A second edition of the book was published, with more lavish illustrations.

Bensoussan's books about and knowledge of the Jews of Morocco are referred to by the growing number of scholars and other groups interested in the history and ethnography of the Moroccan Jewish community.  He has testified on the subject at Parliamentary inquires in Canada.

Bensoussan frequently publishes essays in La Presse.,Huffington Post Québec , La voix sépharade, his own blog and many more publications.

Bensoussan has published two novels (La rosace du roi Salomon and L'énigme du roi Salomon),  a memoir (Le fils de Mogador), two historical essays (L'Espagne des trois religions : grandeur et décadence de la convivencia and Il était une fois le Maroc), and, with Asher Knafo, an art book about illuminated Jewish marriage contracts (Mariage juif à Mogador).

Books 

La Bible prise au berceau, Éditions Du Lys, Montréal, 2002 , 388p.  Ouvrage en trois volumes préfacé par André Chouraqui.
Témoignages - Souvenirs et réflexions de oeuvre de l'Alliance Israélite Universelle, in collaboration with Edmond Elbaz, Éditions Du Lys, Montréal, 2002, 
L'Espagne des trois religions : grandeur et décadence de la convivencia, L'Harmattan, Paris, 2007 
 Mariage juif à Mogador Éditions Du Lys, Montréal, 2004 
Le fils de Mogador, Éditions Du Lys, Montréal, 2002,  
Il était une fois le Maroc - Témoignages du passé judéo-marocain, Éditions Du Lys, Montréal, 2010, Editions iuniverse 2012, 
 L'âge d'or sépharade en Espagne Éditions Du Lys, Montréal, ,202 p., 2006 
La rosace du roi Salomon,  Les Éditions Du Lys, 2011, 
L'énigme du roi Salomon, iuniverse, 2012, 
Antologie des écrivains sépharades du Québec, Éditions Du Marais, Montréal, 2010, 
Isaie - Lecture commentée, Éditions Du Lys, Montréal, 2014, Éditions Du Marais, Montréal, 2014, 
Va mon bien-aimé - Lekha Dodi, Éditions Du Lys, Montréal, 2016,

References

1947 births
People from Essaouira
Canadian engineers
Writers from Quebec
Moroccan writers in French
Moroccan engineers
Living people
21st-century Canadian novelists
Moroccan emigrants to Israel
Moroccan emigrants to Canada
20th-century Moroccan Jews
Canadian people of Moroccan-Jewish descent
Canadian novelists in French
Academic staff of the Université du Québec
Canadian male novelists
21st-century Canadian male writers